The Man is an album by Canadian musician and actor Lorne Greene. It was released by RCA Victor in 1965. 

Greene introduces each song on the album. The title is a reference to Greene's selection as Canada's Man of the Year, in 1965.

"The Man" peaked at #72 on the Billboard Hot 100 chart.

Track listing

Original release
"Pop Goes the Hammer" – 3:09
"End of Track" – 2:28
"Nine Pound Hammer" – 2:37
"Bring on the Dancing Girls" – 2:16
"Oh! What a Town" – 3:08
"Fourteen Men" – 2:40
"Destiny" – 2:56
"Sixteen Tons" – 3:12
"Trouble Row" – 3:30
"Chickasaw Mountain" – 1:58
"Darling, My Darling" – 3:21
"The Man" – 3:21

2009 edition bonus tracks

In addition to the original release, bonus tracks were released in 2009:

"The Search" – 3:16
"Dig, Dig, Dig, Dig (There's No More Water in the Well)" – 2:12
"Ol' Cyclone" – 2:37
"Twilight on the Trail" – 2:25
"Geronimo" – 2:45
"Mule Train" – 2:11
"I'm a Gun" – 3:33
"Gunslinger's Prayer" – 2:30
"An Ol' Tin Cup (And a Battered Ol' Coffee Pot)" – 2:53
"Endless Prairie" – 3:14
"Ringo" – 3:36
"Five Card Stud" – 2:59
"Cool Water" – 2:50
"The Devil's Grin" – 2:08
"Gold" – 1:59
"Sand" – 2:12

References

1965 albums
Lorne Greene albums
RCA Victor albums